The Renault Altica is a concept car made by Renault and was debuted at the 2006 Geneva Motor Show. The design of the car is a 3-door 4-seater shooting-brake. The Altica has a luggage capacity of 1,300 litres and four seats, and also features butterfly doors.

Performance

The Synthetic Jet is a patented aerodynamic device that consists of a 2 mm wide slot located at the extreme rear of the roof. Through this slot air is alternately sucked and blown to control the separation of air depending on the Altica's speed. At  it is claimed that the Synthetic Jet reduces the Altica's Cd by 15% resulting in improved fuel economy.

References

External links

Altica
Grand tourers
Coupés
Cars introduced in 2006